Nedžad Husić (born 15 September 2001) is a Bosnian taekwondo athlete.

Career
Husić won a silver medal at the 2021 European Taekwondo Championships, in the men's 74 kg.

He qualified for the 2020 Summer Olympics through the 2021 European Taekwondo Olympic Qualification Tournament. 

Husić competed at the 2020 Summer Olympics in the men's 68 kg and after four fights achieved 5th place, the best ever Olympic position for Bosnia and Herzegovina including all sports.

References

External links 

 

Bosnia and Herzegovina male taekwondo practitioners
Living people
2001 births
European Taekwondo Championships medalists
Sportspeople from Sarajevo
Bosniaks of Bosnia and Herzegovina
Taekwondo practitioners at the 2020 Summer Olympics
Competitors at the 2018 Mediterranean Games
Competitors at the 2022 Mediterranean Games
Mediterranean Games competitors for Bosnia and Herzegovina
Olympic taekwondo practitioners of Bosnia and Herzegovina